Summer Joy Phoenix (née  Bottom) is an American actress.  She is the youngest sibling of actors River Phoenix, Rain Phoenix, Joaquin Phoenix, and Liberty Phoenix.

Early life 
Phoenix was born in Winter Park, Florida. Her mother, Arlyn Sharon (née Dunetz), was born in New York, to Jewish parents of Hungarian-Jewish and Russian-Jewish descent. Her father, John Lee Bottom, was from California and has English, German, and French ancestry. In 1968, Phoenix's mother moved to California, meeting Phoenix's father while hitchhiking. They married in 1969 and years later joined the religious cult the Children of God, working as missionaries in South America. Phoenix has four siblings: two brothers, actors Joaquin (Leaf) and River, and two sisters, Rain and Liberty. 

She attended New York University's Tisch School of the Arts, but left before graduating to pursue a career in film.

Career 
Phoenix was a child actor, working with agent Iris Burton along with her brothers and sister at the age of two, and went on to have guest roles in Murder, She Wrote, Growing Pains, Swamp Thing, and Airwolf. She appeared in the TV movie Kate's Secret and in Russkies, playing the younger sister of real-life brother Joaquin.
Phoenix later appeared in Wasted, The Laramie Project, SLC Punk!, Dinner Rush, The Believer, and The Faculty. She played leads in Esther Kahn (2000) and Suzie Gold (2004).

In 2002, Phoenix starred in a three-month run of This is Our Youth at the Garrick Theatre alongside Matt Damon and Casey Affleck.

She was a member of the rock band The Causey Way with her sister Rain. She later made guest appearances on albums by Rain's band, the Papercranes.

Personal life 
Phoenix is vegan.

She became engaged to Casey Affleck on December 25, 2003, and gave birth to a son, Indiana August, in Amsterdam. Phoenix and Affleck married on June 3, 2006, in Savannah, Georgia and had a second son Atticus. In March 2016, Affleck and Phoenix publicly announced  they were separating, though it has been acknowledged that they separated in November 2015. Phoenix filed a petition of divorce with the Superior Court of California in Los Angeles on August 1, 2017, citing "irreconcilable differences", and it was finalized that year.

In 2003, she and friends Odessa Whitmire and Ruby Canner opened the vintage clothing boutique Some Odd Rubies on Manhattan's Lower East Side. It closed in 2012.

Filmography

See also 
 List of animal rights advocates

References

External links 
 
 Some Odd Rubies
 
 

20th-century American actresses
21st-century American actresses
Actresses from Florida
American child actresses
American film actresses
American stage actresses
American people of Hungarian-Jewish descent
American people of Russian-Jewish descent
American people of German descent
American people of English descent
American people of French descent
American television actresses
Living people
People from Winter Park, Florida
Summer
Tisch School of the Arts alumni
Year of birth missing (living people)